Südwest Presse is a German daily newspaper based in Ulm, which is distributed in Ulm, Neu-Ulm, Alb-Donau-Kreis and Landkreis Neu-Ulm. It is also the name of a regional cooperative venture (called a Zeitungsverbund – newspaper composite) of over 20 local publications that share regional and national features. All of these newspapers together cover about a third of Baden-Württemberg. Südwest's publishing house Neue Pressegesellschaft prints most of them.

History

Circulation

The paid circulation of all regional imprints in 2012 was 294,251 (excluding Bietigheimer Zeitung and Eberbacher Zeitung), while the paid circulation of the Südwest Presse newspaper was 59,959. The distribution area of Ulm, Neu-Ulm and Alb-Donau-Kreis overlaps with several other dailies, including Schwäbische Zeitung, the Augsburger Allgemeinen and the Stuttgarter Nachrichten, and so there is a competitive relationship despite their correspondent and economic co-operation, detailed below. Südwest Presse, along with most of its sister newspapers, is printed in Rhenish format. A few of the smaller affiliated newspapers use Berliner style.

Regional News Network

The main office of Neue Pressegesellschaft in Ulm issues Südwest Presse-produced national and regional stories for a large number of local publishers. The sections produced are Internationale und Bundes-Politik (international and federal politics), Wirtschaft (economy), Südwest-Umschau (Southwestern sights), Feuilleton (features), Kulturspiegel (cultural mirror), Brennpunkt (focus), Blick in die Welt (worldview), überregionaler Sport (sports in the region), Wochenendbeilage (weekend supplement), and Sonderveröffentlichungen (Special publications). Associated newspapers may use and adapt any of these sections in their own daily newspaper, which they combine with their own local news. The Südwest Presse daily prints almost all of these sections. It is one of the only local newspapers that operates (partly with other newspapers) its own correspondent offices (for instance, in Berlin, Moscow, Washington DC, Paris, London, Rome, and Stuttgart). A total of 18 publishers are behind the correspondent group, located in a region from Bad Mergentheim in the north to Villingen-Schwenningen in the southwest.

Other ventures

Neue Pressegesellschaft (NPG) has a 50 percent stake in the Märkisches publishing company, which produces Märkische Oderzeitung. The other 50 percent is owned by Stuttgarter Zeitung Verlagsgesellschaft mbH, which prints the Stuttgarter Zeitung and the Stuttgarter Nachrichten. Südwest has invested in some of the other local papers, including the Bietigheimer Zeitung, the Hohenloher Tagblatt (69.2%), the Geislinger Zeitung (50%) and the Schwäbisches Tagblatt (49%). They print a weekly public journal for Ulm, Göppingen, Reutlingen, Metzingen, Münsingen and Crailsheim, which includes classifieds. The company also owns Südwest Mail, a local postal service.

Regional issues and associated newspapers

References

1946 establishments in Germany
German-language newspapers
Mass media in Ulm
Daily newspapers published in Germany
Publications established in 1946
German news websites